The You’re A Vision Award is a fan-voted accolade awarded annually to the "most remarkable outfit" in the Eurovision Song Contest. The award was created by the fansite Songfestival.be before the Eurovision Song Contest 2022, after they announced the discontinuation of the Barbara Dex Award created by The House of Eurovision in 1997. This was due to the negative connotation of the award because of its origins of deciding "the worst dressed look" in the contest and wanted to replace it with a more positively connotated accolade.

History

1997–2016: Origins as "Barbara Dex Award"
The origins of the "You’re A Vision Award" come from its predecessor, the Barbara Dex Award, which was created by Edwin van Thillo and Rob Paardekam, who also created the Dutch Eurovision fansite The House of Eurovision, in 1997 until its closure in 2016. Malta's Eurovision Song Contest 1997 entrant, Debbie Scerri, was the first recipient.

2016–2021: Switchover to Songfestival.be and discontinuation of the "Barbara Dex Award"
The award was named after Belgian singer Barbara Dex, who represented Belgium in the Eurovision Song Contest 1993. She wore her own self-made, semi-transparent dress. William Lee Adams, head editor of the Eurovision Song Contest blog site Wiwibloggs, described her as "looking like a lampshade". From 1997 to 2018, the award was given to the "worst dressed outfit" as initially decided internally but was open to the public from 1999.

After the award was passed over to the website Songfestival.be, they switched the criteria for the award to the "most striking look" before the Eurovision Song Contest 2019 to try and get rid of the negative connotation of the award.

2022–present: Creation of the "You’re A Vision Award"
On 13 March 2022, Songfestival.be announced that they would be ending the Barbara Dex Award. Instead, the website would organise a new, replacement award for the "most remarkable outfit". Following an online vote, Songfestival.be announced on 29 April that the new award would be named the "You're A Vision Award" (a word play of "Eurovision"), adding that the new name would serve the purpose of promoting creativity, diversity and positivity in Eurovision on-stage fashion. Australia's Eurovision Song Contest 2022 entrant, Sheldon Riley, was the first recipient of the new award.

Winners

By year

By country

See also 
 List of fashion awards

References

External links
 

Awards established in 2022
European music awards
Eurovision Song Contest
Fashion awards